Popular Dignity, or Popular Dignity Party; It is a political party founded by the politic Ernesto Raúl Habrá, in the year of 2015 to compited un the province of Buenos Aires, as district party. In 2019, the group would cover several districts, thus becoming a national party.

History 
In 2017, the Popular Dignity Party tries to form a district alliance with the political party of the same style, the Popular Party. But, the National Electoral Chamber ratified a first instance ruling, the judge that conforms the measure, Juan Manuel Culotta, underlined the absence of official minutes and documents, with the respective signatures of party authorities, that confirmed their real and active existence. So that stopped due to formal defects the payment of 72 million pesos to the Federal Union Front (name that the future front would bear) to finance the printing of ballots for the next Simultaneous and Mandatory Open Primaries (PASSED). This coalition, considered in the political sphere as a typical "electoral SME", had registered 26 lists, 13 for deputies and 13 for senators.

In 2019 the political group participated in the provincial elections, in only two districts without an alliance; in the province of Buenos Aires in which he took the candidate for Santiago Cuneo for governor of the same, and in the city of Buenos Aires where he took Leonardo Martínez Herrero as head of government of the same. The party failed to qualify for the general elections in any of its districts. In the presidential elections he presented himself representing the Patriot Front at the national level, and as a candidate he nominated the national socialist Alejandro Biondini.

In the 2021 legislative elections, I form various district alliances, the majority of which are right-wing. In the province of Buenos Aires he joined the liberal front Avanza Libertad, in the City of Buenos Aires and in the province Mendoza he presented himself together with the neo-Nazi Frente Patriota, in the province of Cordoba he presented himself together with the libertarian alliance La Libertad Avanza, in the province of Catamarca he presented himself with the alliance that governs the same country, the Frente de Todos, and finally appeared in the province of Santiago del Estero together with the Frente Patriotico Laborista.

Electoral justice fine for 18 million 

In August 2022, the electoral court disapproved of the expense report made by Avanza Libertad for the printing of ballots for the 2021 elections, following a complaint made by members of the front originally from the Democratic Party and the UCEDE accusing members of the party Popular Dignity. Thus, the Avanza Libertad alliance was penalized for a total of 18,197,516 pesos for not having been able to duly prove the destination for which state contributions were used in the presentation of the final report of the primary election campaign.

Name change and merger 

In 2022 Miguel Ángel Pichetto began to form a group and political party of Peronist origin to compete within the Juntos por el Cambio alliance in the 2023 presidential elections. Unexpectedly, the Popular Dignity party decided to disappear by merging with the Lealtad and Dignity party, to form Pichetto's party, Federal Republican Encounter.

References 

Fascism in Argentina
Neo-Nazism in Argentina
Neo-Nazi political parties
Peronist parties and alliances in Argentina
Political parties established in 2019
Political parties in Argentina
Buenos Aires Province